Perevoz is a rural locality (a village) in Borovetskoye Rural Settlement, Sokolsky District, Vologda Oblast, Russia. The population was 14 as of 2002.

Geography 
Perevoz is located 10 km northwest of Sokol (the district's administrative centre) by road. Bolshoy Krivets is the nearest rural locality.

References 

Rural localities in Sokolsky District, Vologda Oblast